Bamnia railway station is a small railway station in Jhabua district, Madhya Pradesh. Its code is BMI. It serves Bamnia village. The station consists of three platforms. It lacks many facilities including water and sanitation. Passenger, MEMU, Express, and Superfast trains halt here.

Trains

The following trains halt at Bamnia railway station in both directions:

 12961/62 Avantika Express
 19023/24 Firozpur Janata Express
 19037/38 Bandra Terminus–Gorakhpur Avadh Express
 19039/40 Bandra Terminus–Muzaffarpur Avadh Express
 19019/20 Bandra Terminus–Dehradun Express

References

Railway stations in Jhabua district
Ratlam railway division